Bandar-e Shiu (also Romanized as Bandar-e Shīū’; also known as Sheyow, Sheyū, Shīū, and Shīvūh) is a village in Behdasht Rural District, Kushk-e Nar District, Parsian County, Hormozgan Province, Iran. At the 2006 census, its population was 488, in 102 families.

References 

Populated places in Parsian County